Aristotelia may refer to:

Aristotelia (plant), a genus of trees in the family Elaeocarpaceae
Aristotelia (moth), a genus of moths in the family Gelechiidae